Ralph Parsons Kinney Sr. (September 30, 1881 – July 1, 1956) was an American football player. He played college football for the Yale Bulldogs football team from 1902 to 1904 and was selected as a consensus All-American at the tackle position in 1902.  He graduated from Yale in 1905.  He managed an orange plantation in Puerto Rico in 1908 and also worked in Texas. In January 1909, he was married to Annie Averill of Beaumont, Texas.  As of 1920, he was employed by the A.B. Leach & Co. in Cleveland.

References

External links

1881 births
1956 deaths
American football guards
American football tackles
Carlisle Indians football coaches
Yale Bulldogs football players
All-American college football players